Marco Giungi (born 30 October 1974) is an Italian race walker who competed at the 2004 Summer Olympics,

Achievements

See also
 Italian all-time lists - 20 km walk
 Italian all-time lists - 50 km walk

References

External links
 

1974 births
Living people
Italian male racewalkers
Athletes (track and field) at the 2004 Summer Olympics
Olympic athletes of Italy
Sportspeople from Espoo
World Athletics Championships athletes for Italy
Athletics competitors of Fiamme Gialle